Matani may refer to:
 Matani, Georgia, a village in Georgia
 Matani monastery
 Matani, Pakistan, a village in Khyber Pakhtunkhwa, Pakistan
 Asadullah Matani, Afghan cricketer

See also 
 Garhi Matani, a village in Punjab, Pakistan